Emin's shrike (Lanius gubernator) is a species of bird in the family Laniidae.

Its sparsely distributed range extends across Cameroon, Central African Republic, Democratic Republic of the Congo, Ivory Coast, Ghana, Guinea-Bissau, Mali, Nigeria, Senegal, South Sudan, and Uganda.
Its natural habitat is dry savanna.

References

Emin's shrike
Birds of Sub-Saharan Africa
Emin's shrike
Taxonomy articles created by Polbot